This is a list of defunct airlines of Zambia.

See also
 List of airlines of Zambia
 List of airports in Zambia

References

Zambia
Airlines
Airlines, defunct